Lindsay Catherine Massengale (born October 6, 1976) is an American soccer defender who played for FC Gold Pride of Women's Professional Soccer and Boston Breakers in the Women's United Soccer Association.

Career

Collegiate career
Massengale was a four-year starter for Clemson University where she earned her Bachelor of Science degree in Health Science in 2000. She was an All-ACC Second Team selection in 1997 and finished her career with five goals and 10 assists for a total of 20 points. Clemson advanced to the NCAA Tournament all four years that she played and advanced to the NCAA Final Eight in 1997.

Professional career
Massengale played for the Boston Breakers in the Women's United Soccer Association, the first women's professional soccer league in the United States from 2001 to 2003.

She played for the FC Gold Pride in the Women's Professional Soccer (WPS) league in 2009.

In 2012, she played for the Boston Breakers in the Women's Premier Soccer League Elite.

Coaching career
Massengale has over 10 years of coaching experience at the Division I women's soccer level, including several years as assistant coach at Idaho State University and Northeastern University.

References

External links
 FC Gold Pride player profile
 Idaho State coaching profile
 Northeastern coaching profile

FC Gold Pride players
1976 births
Living people
Clemson Tigers women's soccer players
Boston Breakers players
Women's Premier Soccer League Elite players
American women's soccer players
Women's association football defenders
California Storm players
Women's Premier Soccer League players
Women's Professional Soccer players
Boston Breakers (WUSA) players
Women's United Soccer Association players